Blaine M. "Baldy" Thomas (August 1888 – August 21, 1915) was a starting pitcher in Major League Baseball who played briefly for the Boston Red Sox during the 1911 season. Listed at 5' 10", 165 lb., Thomas batted and threw right-handed. He was born in Glendora, California.

In his one-season career, Thomas posted a perfect 0.00 earned run average with seven walks and three hits allowed in 4⅓ innings of work and did not have a decision or strikeouts.

Thomas died at the age of 27 in Payson, Arizona.

External links

Retrosheet

1888 births
1915 deaths
Boston Red Sox players
Major League Baseball pitchers
Baseball players from California
Victoria Bees players
Sacramento Sacts players